Ashley Joseph Hand (born 24 April 1994 in Nuneaton) is a British racing driver currently competing in the British Touring Car Championship with CarStore Power Maxed Racing. He was the GT4 champion of the 2019 British GT Championship.

Career

Karting
Hand started karting in 2008, at the age of 13, and over a 5 year career he won various titles in the Rotax Junior and Rotax Max categories. He returned to karting in 2015 to compete in the Kartmasters British Grand Prix for the third time in the Rotax Max class.

Renault UK Clio Cup
Hand made his car racing debut in the 2013 Renault UK Clio Cup with Team Pyro. He came 9th in the standings in his rookie season. He switched to SV Racing for the 2014 season, where he improved to 8th. Switching back to Team Pyro for the 2015 season, Hand finished second in the standings, losing the title to Ashley Sutton due to a mechanical failure in the final round.

He returned to the championship part-time in 2017 and 2018, with Team Pyro and Matrix Motorsport respectively.

Renault Sport Trophy
Hand competed in selected rounds of the AM class and the Endurance Trophy of the 2016 Renault Sport Trophy, where he was 22nd in the Endurance Trophy and 14th in the AM class.

British GT Championship
Hand joined TF Sport alongside Tom Canning for the GT4 category of the 2019 British GT Championship. With 1 win and 4 podiums, they won the GT4 championship title.

British Touring Car Championship
Following a two-year sabbatical, it was announced in 2022 that Hand would partner Michael Crees at Power Maxed Racing for the 2022 British Touring Car Championship.

Karting record

Karting career summary

Racing record

Racing career summary

Complete British GT Championship results
(key) (Races in bold indicate pole position) (Races in italics indicate fastest lap)

Complete British Touring Car Championship results
(key) Races in bold indicate pole position (1 point awarded – 2002–2003 all races, 2004–present just in first race) Races in italics indicate fastest lap (1 point awarded all races) * signifies that driver lead race for at least one lap (1 point awarded – 2002 just in feature races, 2003–present all races)

References

External links 
 
 
 Driver Profile at BTCC

1994 births
Living people
British racing drivers
British Touring Car Championship drivers
British GT Championship drivers
Renault UK Clio Cup drivers